Sumner Byron Myers (February 19, 1910 – October 8, 1955) was an American mathematician specializing in topology and differential geometry. He studied at Harvard University under H. C. Marston Morse, where he graduated with a Ph.D. in 1932. Myers then pursued postdoctoral studies at Princeton University (1934–1936) before becoming a professor for mathematics at the University of Michigan. He died unexpectedly from a heart attack during the 1955 Michigan–Army football game at Michigan Stadium.

Sumner B. Myers Prize
The Sumner B. Myers Prize was created in his honor for distinguished theses within the LSA Mathematics Department. The recipients since 2004 are as follows:

 2004: Peter Storm
 2005: Kevin Woods
 2006: Calin Chindris
 2007: Yann Bernard, Samuel Payne
 2008: Bryden Cais
 2009: Susan Sierra
 2010: Paul Johnson, Alan Stapledon
 2011: Kevin Tucker
 2012: Matthew Elsey
 2013: Max Glick
 2014: Jae Kyoung Kim
 2015: June Huh, Mary Wootters
 2016: Brandon Seward
 2017: Hamed Razavi
 2018: Rohini Ramadas
 2019: Visu Makam
 2020: Han Huang
 2021:	Emanuel Reinecke
 2022:	Xin Zhang

References

Further reading 

1910 births
1955 deaths
20th-century American mathematicians
Topologists
Harvard University alumni
University of Michigan faculty
Geometers